The One and Only Herb McGwyer Plays Wallis Island is a 2007 short film, directed by James Griffiths, and written by and starring Tim Key and Tom Basden. It was nominated for a 2008 BAFTA Award for Best Short Film award, and won the UK Film Council Award for Best British Short Film at the Edinburgh International Film Festival.

Plot summary
Lottery winner Charles Heath (Tim Key) pays a folk singer Herb McGwyer (Tom Basden) to visit his private island and perform for him for a fee of half a million pounds. Isolated from the world, the jaded folk singers' passion for music is slowly reignited.

External links
 Full Film at Moxie Pictures site

References

British short films
2007 films
2000s English-language films